Ministry of Expatriates Affairs  (Arabic: وزارة  شؤون المغتربين ) is a cabinet ministry of Yemen.

List of ministers 

 Ahmed Awadh bin Mubarak (17 December 2020 – present)
 Alawi Ba Fakih (9 November 2014)

See also 

 Politics of Yemen

References 

Government ministries of Yemen